Sašo Janev (born 3 May 1970) is a Macedonian former footballer who is kast known to have played as a defender for Devolli. He is now a coach.

Career

Before the 1999 season, Janev signed for Ecuadorian side Emelec. Before the second half of 1999–00, he signed for Vardar in North Macedonia. Before the second half of 2001–02, he signed for Polishclub Hutnik Kraków. In 2002, Janev returned to Vardar in the Macedonian top flight. After that, he signed for Albanian second tier team Devolli.

He now works as a coach.

References

External links

 

Macedonian footballers
Expatriate footballers in Ecuador
Living people
Expatriate footballers in Albania
Association football defenders
1970 births
FK Vardar players
Macedonian First Football League players
Hutnik Nowa Huta players
Macedonian expatriate sportspeople in Poland
Macedonian expatriate sportspeople in Albania
FK Rabotnički players
Macedonian expatriate footballers
Expatriate footballers in Poland
North Macedonia international footballers